Mauro da Silva Gomes (born 12 January 1968), known as Mauro Silva, is a Brazilian retired professional footballer who played as a defensive midfielder.

A hard-working player with great stamina, as well as tackling and leadership skills, he was best known for his spell with Deportivo. He amassed competitive totals of 458 games and one goal over 13 La Liga seasons, winning six major titles.

Silva represented Brazil at the 1994 World Cup and two Copa América tournaments, winning the former tournament.

Club career
Silva was born in São Bernardo do Campo, São Paulo. After starting playing with Guarani he moved to Bragantino in 1990, where he spent the following two seasons. Subsequently, he was acquired up by Spain's Deportivo de La Coruña, for 250 million pesetas (approximately €1.6 million), arriving at the same time as countryman Bebeto.

Silva was an everpresent fixture with the Galicians, only suspensions and injuries preventing him from being cast into the starting XI – in the 1994–95 campaign he only appeared in six La Liga matches and, already 36, was limited to 20 in his final year – as he helped them to one league, two cups and three supercups, adding to this the team's five participations in the UEFA Champions League, reaching the semi-finals in 2003–04: after a 0–0 away draw against FC Porto he missed the second leg due to suspension, and Depor lost 1–0.

On 22 May 2005, after 13 years with Deportivo, Silva was replaced by longtime understudy Aldo Duscher during a 3–0 home loss against RCD Mallorca, bidding farewell to the Estadio Riazor and football in the same match as another club legend, Fran.

In December 2016, as Deportivo celebrated its 110th anniversary, Silva was chosen by club fans as the best players in its history.

International career
With Brazil, Silva collected 59 caps over ten years, making his debut in 1991. He played in every match and minute (except for the second half of the group stage match against Sweden) in his nation's victorious campaign at the 1994 FIFA World Cup; in the same year, he was named by FIFA as the ninth best player in the world. According to the organisation, the lack of attacking play in the final of the tournament against Italy was in part down to strong holding midfield play by Dino Baggio for Italy, and Dunga and Mauro Silva for Brazil; following a 0–0 draw after extra-time, Brazil won the match in a penalty shoot-out.

Career statistics

Club

International

Honours
Bragantino
Campeonato Paulista: 1990

Deportivo
La Liga: 1999–2000
Copa del Rey: 1994–95, 2001–02
Supercopa de España: 1995, 2000, 2002

Brazil
FIFA World Cup: 1994
Copa América: 1997; runner-up 1991
CONCACAF Gold Cup: third place 1998

Individual
Bola de Ouro: 1991
Bola de Prata: 1991, 1992

References

External links

Deportivo archives

1968 births
Living people
People from São Bernardo do Campo
Naturalised citizens of Spain
Brazilian footballers
Association football midfielders
Campeonato Brasileiro Série A players
Guarani FC players
Clube Atlético Bragantino players
La Liga players
Deportivo de La Coruña players
Brazil international footballers
1991 Copa América players
1994 FIFA World Cup players
1997 Copa América players
1998 CONCACAF Gold Cup players
FIFA World Cup-winning players
Copa América-winning players
Brazilian expatriate footballers
Brazilian expatriate sportspeople in Spain
Expatriate footballers in Spain
Footballers from São Paulo (state)